Talitsa is a rural locality (a village) in Vakhnevskoye Rural Settlement, Nikolsky District, Vologda Oblast, Russia. The population was 5 as of 2002.

Geography 
Talitsa is located 69 km northwest of Nikolsk (the district's administrative centre) by road. Panteleyevo is the nearest rural locality.

References 

Rural localities in Nikolsky District, Vologda Oblast